South Coast Rail is a project to build a new southern line of the MBTA Commuter Rail system along several abandoned and freight-only rail lines. The line has been planned to restore passenger rail service between Boston and the cities of Taunton, Fall River, and New Bedford, via the towns of Berkley, and Freetown, on the south coast of Massachusetts. It would restore passenger service to some of the southern lines of the former Old Colony Railroad and the New York, New Haven and Hartford Railroad (service along the Southeastern lines was largely restored in 1997 and 2007).

Passenger service was discontinued in 1958, and the restoration proposal surfaced in the 1980s. A full planning process was held starting in 1990 but was suspended in 2002 due to increasing costs. Planning restarted in 2007 and in March 2017, the project was split into two phases. Phase 1 provides interim service to Fall River and New Bedford while the northern section of the line is built in Phase 2. Several separately-funded projects were constructed between 2013 and 2019 in preparation for the project. Phase 1 construction began on July 2, 2019 with a projected cost of $1.047 billion and completion at the end of 2023. Total cost of the program is estimated at $3.42 billion with completion in 2030.

Project history

Previous service
The lines planned for commuter rail service date largely from the 1840s (the Fall River Railroad in 1846 and New Bedford Railroad in 1873) and were later part of the Old Colony Railroad network. The New York, New Haven and Hartford Railroad leased the entire Old Colony system beginning in 1893, and ran commuter and intercity service to Fall River and New Bedford. In the early 20th century, trains took a shorter route through Easton. However, in the 1930s, trains were routed through Mansfield on the Boston & Providence mainline, further to the west. Service finally ended in 1958, after construction of Massachusetts Route 24 and most of the local Interstate Highway System.

Restoration planning

In the 1980s — during the first expansion of commuter service in Massachusetts in decades — the restoration of the lines to New Bedford and Fall River was proposed. (All three routes used the same lines from Taunton south to Fall River and New Bedford). By 1988, the MBTA was tentatively planning to extend service to Taunton via Stoughton.

The first serious study, completed in January 1990, concluded that the Stoughton Branch was the most viable route. The study was criticized for not considering other alternatives, including express buses. In March 1991, newly elected governor William Weld asked the state legislature to authorize the sale of bonds to finance further studies.

In the early 1990s, the Old Colony Lines Middleborough/Lakeville Line and Plymouth/Kingston Line, plus the delayed Greenbush Line) were chosen as Big Dig environmental mitigation instead of routes to Fall River and New Bedford; the first two routes opened in September 1997 and Greenbush in 2007. The Old Colony mainline was rebuilt with restricted single-track sections through parts of Dorchester and Quincy, limiting the capacity required for reaching the South Coast via Middleborough — such that service could be operated to one of Fall River and New Bedford, but not both.

However, planning for service to the South Coast continued. The March 1995 Expanded Feasibility Study analyzed routes absent from the 1990 report, concluding that both the Stoughton and Attleboro routes would be viable and that a partial Stoughton Branch extension to North Easton would be most cost-effective. In September 1995, the MBTA filed an Environmental Notification Form with the EPA for service via the Attleboro route, with a curved  'Attleboro Bypass' connecting the Northeast Corridor to the Attleboro Secondary just north of Attleboro proper. The then-$156 million project was to be completed in 2000.

In August 1996, Weld signed a bill giving $136 million to commuter rail expansion, while the state legislature directed the MBTA to further study alternatives. However, in 1997 the Expanded Alternatives Analysis showed vastly increased costs — $410 million via Attleboro, $426 million via Stoughton, or $312 million via Middleborough. The report recommended the Stoughton route as the most cost-effective due to its high ridership, despite the higher cost.

A groundbreaking ceremony was held in October 1998, but since planning was not complete no real construction began. Based on an April 1999 analysis of South Station operations, the July 1999 Draft Environmental Impact Report concluded that the Stoughton route was the only viable route, with projected service of 20 trains per day to each of Fall River and New Bedford for an estimated total of 4,325 daily riders. In January 2000, following then-governor Paul Cellucci's reapproval, the state reported that construction would begin in late 2002 and last until 2004. The Draft Environmental Statement certificate was received in November 2000; the EPA confirmed that Stoughton was the only practical route but required a Final Environmental Impact Statement (FEIS). The FEIS was released in April 2002 and approved in August; however, in July 2002 the MBTA revised the project cost to $600 million with an opening date of 2007.

Due to ballooning costs, Governor Romney's administration suspended the Growth Task Force and stopped project planning in November 2002; the environmental approval process was stopped in May 2003.

Planning restart

In October 2004, the Southeastern Regional Planning and Economic Development District restarted the Growth Task Force, even while the MBTA was conducting its review of the project. In March 2005, Romney allowed the project to proceed and allocated $670 million for the project, then projected to open between 2011 and 2013. In June 2005, the Chief of Commonwealth Development stated that the cost could be as high as $1 billion.

In April 2007, the Massachusetts Executive Office of Transportation released South Coast Rail: A Plan For Action, which restarted the planning process from the beginning. The plan estimated project costs at $1.435 billion (including $163 million for procuring additional rolling stock and $31.6 million for expanding South Station) with opening in December 2016. A Strategic Environmental Permitting Plan was released in August 2007, followed by a Phase 1 Alternatives Analysis Report in April 2008 which narrowed 65 options (including unlikely modes like heavy rail metro and monorail) to five plausible alternatives including Attleboro, Stoughton, and Middleboro routes plus express bus service or a mixture of Attleboro and Middleboro service. MassDOT released 18 potential station sites for the project in September 2008.

In May 2008, MassDOT issued a formal request to the US Army Corps of Engineers to allow discharge of fill materials into wetlands — effectively starting the formal environmental review process. A federal Notice of Intent and state Environmental Notification Form were filed in November 2008.

In a May 2009 interview, Commonwealth Treasurer Tim Cahill stated that "it is virtually going to be impossible" for the state to open the lines in 2016 as planned due to the recession, adding that federal funding was unlikely to be obtained because "[t]he federal government doesn't trust us anymore because of the Big Dig." However, the state continued to publish studies, releasing the South Coast Rail Economic Development and Land Use Corridor Plan in June 2009 and the Phase 2 Alternatives Analysis Report (which indicated electric or diesel service through Stoughton as the best choice) in September 2009. The corridor plan called for substantial mixed-use transit-oriented development around stations.

On October 2, 2008, the state government announced an agreement with CSX Transportation for the purchase and upgrade of several of CSX's freight lines in the state. CSX agreed to sell its lines from Taunton to Fall River and New Bedford for use by the South Coast Rail project, as well as the Grand Junction Branch, the Framingham-to-Worcester section of the Worcester Line, and the South Boston Running Track. Other parts of the agreement included plans for double-stack freights west of Worcester and the abandonment of Beacon Park Yard. The agreement was signed on September 23, 2009. On June 11, 2010, the state and CSX completed the first phase of the agreement, including the transfer of the South Coast Rail lines to MassDOT.

The Army Corps of Engineers released a Draft Environmental Impact Statement in March 2011. However, the DEIS differed from the previous reports by strongly recommending that service be electric, stating that the higher ridership (9,580 projected daily riders versus 8,140), decreased travel time due to the higher acceleration of electric locomotives and their 100 mph top speed versus 79 mph for diesels, and reduced pollution outweighed the increased cost of electrification. The electric alternative was projected to cost $1.88 billion versus $1.48 billion for diesel service, with the increased cost from the overhead wire infrastructure as well as the cost of buying electric locomotives plus new coaches capable of 100 mph speeds. (Current coaches are limited to 80 mph even on sections of the Northeast Corridor rated for 150 mph.)

Funding
In July 2013, after substantial discussion the Massachusetts Legislature overrode Governor Deval Patrick's veto and passed a major transportation funding bill providing an average of $600 million per year in additional funding. The bill mentioned South Coast Rail as deserving funding but did not specifically allocate monies to the project. In September 2013, the Army Corps of Engineers released the Final Environmental Impact statement, with few changes from the Draft statement and cost revised slightly downwards to $1.817 billion.

On November 13, 2013, the Massachusetts Joint Committee on Transportation approved a $12 billion spending authorization that includes $2.2 billion for South Coast Rail. The spending bill, which also included $1.3 billion for the Green Line Extension and $300 million for South Station expansion, was then sent to the Massachusetts House and Senate for debate.  On April 18, 2014, a modified version of the bill was signed into law, allocating $2.3 billion for South Coast Rail, $1.33 billion for the Green Line Extension, and $325 million for South Station.

On April 22, 2019, Massachusetts Department of Transportation Secretary Stephanie Pollack announced that funding and Army Corps of Engineers permits for the Phase 1 plan were in place and that the project will proceed "full speed ahead," with a late-2023 target date.  In July 2019, the Baker-Polito Administration filled an $18 billion transportation bond bill that included $825 million for Phase 1 South Coast Rail.  The total cost of Phase 1 is $1.047 billion and will be paid entirely by the Commonwealth of Massachusetts through bonds under the Rail Enhancement Program.

Project changes

In June 2016, the MBTA announced that the project cost had been revised to $3.42 billion, with completion not expected until 2030. The substantial delay and increase in cost caused officials to consider alternate plans, including an earlier, interim service to New Bedford via Middleborough with 7 round trip trains to New Bedford and 6 round trip trains to Fall River on weekdays. In March 2017, the state announced a revised plan intended to provide service sooner for a total cost of $3.42 billion. The $1.1 billion Phase 1 would follow the Middleborough route and open in 2024; Phase 2 would follow the original route through Stoughton (including electrification) and open in 2029.

The revised plan has attracted criticism from several directions, including some of those who had previously advocated for the project as well as previous opponents. Middleborough and Lakeville officials were critical of the possibility of abandoning the current Middleborough/Lakeville station — which has attracted transit-oriented development — or requiring its riders to take a shuttle train, as well as possible traffic issues from a downtown Middleborough station. The New Bedford mayor was critical of the longer travel times of the Middleborough routing, and the Taunton mayor was critical of Phase 1 lacking the downtown Taunton station of the previous plan. Stoughton, Easton, and Raynham officials continued their previous opposition to South Coast Rail.

Construction

Early work 
Several elements of the project were constructed prior to the main construction phases. In February 2010, MassDOT received a $20 million TIGER grant to replace three bridges in New Bedford built around 1907, for immediate freight use and future South Coast Rail service. The grant represented part of the $71.4 million the state had applied for to fund the Fast Track New Bedford project, which would have included a fourth bridge, construction of New Bedford station with bus and ferry facilities, and pedestrian and bicycle access improvements. The MBTA opened bidding in July 2010 and issued a Notice To Proceed in October 2010; the replacement bridges opened for Massachusetts Coastal Railroad freights in November 2011.

In mid-November 2013, MassDOT replaced 42,000 ties along  of the Fall River and New Bedford branches, funded as a freight improvement project that also serves as a prerequisite for South Coast Rail. A $18.4 million project was issued on October 22, 2014 and reconstructed six grade crossings in Taunton, Freetown, and New Bedford.  The Dean Street (US-44) crossing in Taunton was replaced in August 2015 with work projected to last until late 2016. On November 25, 2014, a $42 million contract was awarded for the replacement of three bridges (President Avenue, Brownell Avenue, and Golf Club Road) in Fall River plus the Wamsutta Street bridge in New Bedford. The bridges were completed in early 2017.

Phase 1 
On June 18, 2014, the MassDOT board awarded a $12 million one-year contract (with to $210 million possible over 10 years) to a joint venture between Vanasse Hangen Brustlin, Inc. and HNTB Corp. for "program management, early design development, and environmental permitting". While MassDOT managed the early action culverts and bridges contracts, oversight of the program was transferred to the MBTA in preparation for the start of Phase 1 construction in 2019. To provide additional technical assistance, the MBTA also awarded a $62 million contract to AECOM for program and construction management. A groundbreaking ceremony was held on July 2, 2019.

Phase 1 was divided into eight major construction contracts. Contract #1 for 57 turnouts was awarded to Progress Rail on December 14, 2018. Completion of the $9.8 million contract was scheduled for February 2021. Contract #2 included the reconstruction of 46 culverts, cleaning 16 additional culverts and removal of one more, reconstruction of one grade crossing, and construction of six wetland impact mitigation areas. The $18.3 million contract was awarded to J.F. White on March 6, 2019, with completion expected in June 2020. Contract #3 included replacement of four railroad bridges and one culvert, plus  of track replacement. The $26.1 million contract was awarded to J.F. White, with completion planned for November 2020.

On May 11, 2020, a $159 million contract (#7) was awarded to Skanska DW White JV for the Fall River Secondary portion of phase 1. The work included construction of Freetown station and Fall River station,  of track work, rehabilitation of 10 grade crossings and 8 bridges, and construction of Weaver's Cove layover yard in northern Fall River. Construction was estimated to take 30 months. The main construction contract (#6) for the New Bedford branch includes  of track work on the Middleboro Secondary and New Bedford Secondary, four stations (and ), the Wamsutta layover yard in New Bedford, seven bridges, and associated infrastructure. It also includes signal and communication systems for the whole project area. The $403.5 million contract was awarded to SCR Constructors (a joint venture of The Middlesex Corporation and Tutor Perini) on August 24, 2020; construction began later in 2020 and was estimated to take 37 months.

Two additional major contracts are part of the project. Contract #10 is for construction of a footbridge over Route 18 at New Bedford station. The $21.3 million contract was awarded in December 2022. Contract #12 is for traffic mitigation during construction, including intersection and traffic signal modifications. The $8.5 million contract was awarded in early 2022. Replacement of a bridge carrying Route 24 over the New Bedford Secondary in East Taunton was originally planned to be part of South Coast Rail as Contract #5. It was combined with a larger MassDOT bridge replacement project on Route 24, which includes replacement of the Route 24 bridge over the Middleborough Secondary. The contract was awarded in January 2021, with work expected to last until 2027. 

By May 2021, Fall River Secondary work was 20% complete, while Middleborough Secondary/New Bedford Main Line work was 5% complete. Progress was at 35% and 18% by November 2021. In 2022, granite blocks from culverts and bridge abutments replaced during the project were dumped into Nantucket Sound off Yarmouth and Harwich. Overall project completion reached the halfway point in mid-2022. By August 2022, Fall River Secondary work was 81% complete, while Middleborough Secondary/New Bedford Main Line work was 53% complete. Substantial completion of the Fall River Secondary work was announced in December 2022, with revenue service still planned for late 2023.

Phase 2 
Phase 2 work includes reconstructing track from the existing Stoughton station to Cotley Junction to meet the Phase 1 work. Four stations will be constructed along this alignment: North Easton, Easton Village, Raynham Place, and Taunton along with reconstruction of Canton Center and Stoughton Stations. The Fall River branch will also be extended to a new terminus at Battleship Cove, and the entire line will be electrified. The Middleboro Secondary would return to exclusive freight use, though its upgrades are to be maintained to provide redundancy during service disruptions. The design for the Northern Corridor is being advanced to 30%, which includes several bridges over the Taunton River.

Several town government officials along the planned Phase 2 route have expressed concerns about the plans. In 2009, Stoughton officials indicated that they would seek for a tunnel to be built through the downtown area — as was done in Hingham on the Greenbush Line — with Stoughton station moved underground. The Easton town government opposes the construction of Phase II, claiming visual and environmental impacts. In 2014, Raynham officials expressed interest in lowering tracks under Route 138 to prevent traffic impacts.

Between Easton and Raynham, the proposed route passes along an embankment that is currently used for off-road vehicles through the Hockomock Swamp. Due to the sensitive environmental area, an  elevated trestle is proposed at a cost of $50 million to allow animals to pass under the tracks and limit the disturbance to the existing ground.

Route diagrams

References

External links

South Coast Rail Final Environmental Impact Statement - United States Army Corps of Engineers

MBTA Commuter Rail
Rail infrastructure in Massachusetts
Passenger rail transportation in Massachusetts
Proposed railway lines in Massachusetts
Old Colony Railroad
Proposed public transportation in Massachusetts
2023 in rail transport
2030 in rail transport